Lisle is a village in Broome County, New York, United States. The population was 320 at the 2010 census. It is part of the Binghamton Metropolitan Statistical Area. The village was named after a community in France.

The village of Lisle is in the southeast part of the town of Lisle and is north of Binghamton.

History

The inhabitants voted against forming a village in 1867, but the village was later incorporated in 1876.

Geography

The Tioughnioga River forms the eastern boundary of the village. It is a tributary of the Susquehanna River.

The village is on New York State Route 79 west of U.S. Route 11 and Interstate 81, and is located one mile north of the larger village of Whitney Point.

Demographics

As of the census of 2000, there were 302 people, 116 households, and 75 families residing in the village.  The population density was 325.5 people per square mile (125.4/km2).  There were 135 housing units at an average density of 145.5 per square mile (56.0/km2).  The racial makeup of the village was 98.34% White, 0.66% Black or African American, 0.99% from other races. Hispanic or Latino of any race were 0.99% of the population.

There were 116 households, out of which 33.6% had children under the age of 18 living with them, 49.1% were married couples living together, 12.9% had a female householder with no husband present, and 34.5% were non-families. 30.2% of all households were made up of individuals, and 19.0% had someone living alone who was 65 years of age or older.  The average household size was 2.60 and the average family size was 3.30.

In the village, the population was spread out, with 26.8% under the age of 18, 8.6% from 18 to 24, 28.8% from 25 to 44, 17.9% from 45 to 64, and 17.9% who were 65 years of age or older.  The median age was 36 years. For every 100 females, there were 91.1 males.  For every 100 females age 18 and over, there were 87.3 males.

The median income for a household in the village was $33,750, and the median income for a family was $45,625. Males had a median income of $31,797 versus $26,250 for females. The per capita income for the village was $14,685.  About 10.7% of families and 12.6% of the population were below the poverty line, including 18.5% of those under the age of eighteen and 5.4% of those 65 or over.

Notable person
Thomas J. Paterson (1805-1885), US congressman

References

Villages in New York (state)
Binghamton metropolitan area
Villages in Broome County, New York